Mary Stevens, M.D. is a 1933 American pre-Code drama film starring Kay Francis, Lyle Talbot and Glenda Farrell. The film was directed by Lloyd Bacon and based on the story by Virginia Kellogg. It was released by Warner Bros. on July 22, 1933. A female doctor who has romantic troubles decides to have a baby without the benefit of marriage.

Plot
Mary Stevens (Kay Francis) and her old friend Don Andrews (Lyle Talbot) find themselves graduating from medical school at the same time. They decide to set up their respective medical offices in the same building. Mary builds her reputation despite many patients refusing to be treated by a woman. Don, however, begins dating Lois Cavanaugh (Thelma Todd), whose family is rich and influential, and neglects his practice for the privileges of a social life.

Despite Mary's love for Don, he marries Lois and sets up a new office with a high class clientele. He also gives Mary a new office right next to his; while she ends up making a name for herself in the medical community, Don begins to pilfer funds from his practice. Jealousy and mistrust drive Mary and Don apart, seemingly for good.

Two years go by and Mary, now a famous doctor, takes a much-needed vacation. While on vacation she runs into Don, who is now on the lam from the authorities. Mary and Don have an affair, and Don tries to get a divorce. Lois is willing but her father doesn't want the Cavanaugh name mixed up in any scandal. He clears Don's name and gets all charges against Don dropped, on the condition that Don will not divorce Lois for at least six months. When Mary finds herself pregnant with Don's child and Don unable to marry her, she must decide whether she should tell Don or raise the child on her own.

While returning on a ship, several children develop polio including her baby, who dies 2 days before they dock. A despondent Mary is caught in the act of suicide and saves a child in the final scene. Mary regains her confidence and the couple reunites.

Cast
 Kay Francis as Mary Stevens
 Lyle Talbot as Don
 Glenda Farrell as Glenda
 Thelma Todd as Lois
 Harold Huber as Tony
 Una O'Connor as Mrs. Arnell Simmons
 Charles Wilson as Walter Rising
 Hobart Cavanaugh as Alf Simmons

References

External links
 
 
 
 

1933 films
1933 romantic drama films
1930s pregnancy films
American black-and-white films
American romantic drama films
Films directed by Lloyd Bacon
Medical-themed films
Warner Bros. films
Films with screenplays by Robert Lord (screenwriter)
1930s English-language films
1930s American films
Films scored by Bernhard Kaun
Films about physicians
Adultery in films